Yb is a town in the Komi Republic, in western Russia. It has a population of 550.

References

Cities and towns in the Komi Republic